, pronounced locally as Kamihichiken, is a district of northwest Kyoto, Japan. It is the oldest hanamachi (geisha district) in Kyoto, and is located just east of the Kitano Tenman-gū Shrine. The name Kamishichiken literally means "Seven Upper Houses." These refer to the seven teahouses built from the equipment and material left over from the rebuilding of the Kitano Shrine in Muromachi era (1333–1573).

Kamishichiken is located in Kyoto's Nishijin area, which is known for traditional hand-woven textiles. Unlike the other remaining districts, which are located close to the city center, Kamishichiken is further away, and accordingly significantly quieter and attracts fewer tourists. The geisha of this district are known for being subtle and demure, few in number but each highly accomplished dancers and musicians. There are approximately 25  (apprentice geisha) and geisha in Kamishichiken, along with 11 teahouses.

The district crest is a ring of skewered  (sweet dumplings). On lanterns they appear as red circles on white paper (as opposed to Gion, which uses a similar design, but with the reverse colors – white  on a red background).

Events

Plum Blossom Festival

Kitano Odori

Beer garden

See also
 in Kyoto (the ):
Gion Kobu
Gion Higashi
Pontocho
Miyagawacho
Shimabara (defunct)

References

External links 

Kamishichiken maiko Ichimame's blog
Asahi Shimbun: Hits keep coming for Web-savvy 'maiko'
Daily Yomiuri: Kyoto's maiko promote culture via Web
Kitano Tenman-gū (北野天満宮)
Nakazato Ochaya, operated by the Kamishichiken geiko Naosuzu
Flower Towns and Maiko

Geography of Kyoto